Belizean Kriol can refer to:
Belizean Kriol people 
Belizean Creole, the English-based creole language

Language and nationality disambiguation pages